The Van Hool AGG300 is a 25-metre long bi-articulated bus produced by Van Hool NV at their Belgian facility in Koningshooikt.

In the 1990s two prototypes were built, one of these vehicles still remains in service in Liège, and the other (ex-demonstrator) in Angola.

In 2001, the AGG300 received an updated front design and became known as the newAGG300. In 2002, GVB of Utrecht ordered 15 buses of this type for lines 11 and 12, which are particularly busy. Utrecht was the first city where these buses were widely used. In 2003, 12 additional buses were delivered.

In June 2006, as part of the 100th anniversary of public transport in Groningen, an AGG300 was ordered as part of a 3-day demonstration, which ran route 15 in the morning and route 22 in the afternoon.

ABC Industries of North America has plans to bring the AGG300 into USA and Canada, although the length of the bus will probably mean it will exceed regulations.

See also 

 List of buses

References

External links
 Van Hool AGG300 specifications

Articulated buses
Bi-articulated buses
Low-floor buses